Emilio Caldara (20 January 1868 – 31 October 1942) was an Italian Socialist Party politician. He was also a member of the Unitary Socialist Party. He was mayor of Milan.

See also
Mayor of Milan

References

1868 births
1942 deaths
19th-century Italian politicians
20th-century Italian politicians
Italian Socialist Party politicians
Unitary Socialist Party (Italy, 1922) politicians
Mayors of Milan
Italian Aventinian secessionists